Srinivasan Sampath (born 1961) is an Indian electrochemist, nanotechnologist and a professor of the department of chemistry at Indian Institute of Science. He is known for his studies on supercapacitors and nano bimetallics. He is an elected fellow of the Indian Academy of Sciences and the Indian National Science Academy. The Council of Scientific and Industrial Research, the apex agency of the Government of India for scientific research, awarded him the Shanti Swarup Bhatnagar Prize for Science and Technology, one of the highest Indian science awards, in 2006, for his contributions to chemical sciences.

Biography 
Srinivasan Sampath, born on 25 February 1961, is a professor at the department of chemistry at the Indian Institute of Science where he is involved in researches on the interfacial properties of materials and surfaces. He is reported to have done extensive work on the development of supercapacitors and nano bimetallics as well as on the investigation of their applications. He has documented his researches in several peer-reviewed articles; the online article repository of the Indian Academy of Sciences has listed 78 f them. He received the Bronze Medal of the Chemical Research Society of India in 2005 The Council of Scientific and Industrial Research awarded him the Shanti Swarup Bhatnagar Prize, one of the highest Indian science awards, in 2006 He was elected as a fellow by the Indian Academy of Sciences in 2009 and he became an elected fellow of the Indian National Science Academy in 2015.

See also 
 Supercapacitors

References

External links

Recipients of the Shanti Swarup Bhatnagar Award in Chemical Science
1961 births
Indian scientific authors
Scientists from Bangalore
Fellows of the Indian Academy of Sciences
20th-century Indian chemists
Living people
Academic staff of the Indian Institute of Science
Fellows of the Indian National Science Academy
Electrochemists
Indian nanotechnologists